Ben T. Ysursa is an American attorney and politician who served as the Secretary of State of Idaho from 2003 to 2015.

Early life and education
A native of Boise, Idaho, Ysursa graduated from Bishop Kelly High School in 1967. He earned a bachelor's degree from Gonzaga University in 1971 and a Juris Doctor from the Saint Louis University School of Law in 1974.

Career 
Ysursa was admitted to the Idaho State Bar in 1974.

From 1974 to 2003, Ysursa served in the Idaho Secretary of State office under his predecessor, Pete T. Cenarrusa. He held the positions of Deputy Secretary of State (1974–1976) and Chief Deputy Secretary of State (1976–2003).

Ysursa was elected Secretary of State in 2002 with 77.5 percent of the vote. He was reelected unopposed in 2006. Ysursa was elected to a third term in 2010, defeating Democratic nominee Mack Sermon with 74.3 percent of the vote.

Ysursa did not seek reelection in 2014. He was succeeded by Lawerence Denney.

Personal life
Ysursa is married and has three children with his wife, Penny. They also have two grandchildren.

Awards
 "Boyd Martin Award" from the Association of Idaho Cities 
 Recipient for Outstanding Administrator (1992) from the Idaho Republican Party.

Service on Committees
 Board of Land Commissioners (member)
 Board of Examiners (member)
 Board of Canvassers (chairman)
 Land Board briefing committee (member)
 Board of Examiners sub-committee (member)
 various state and city committees (member)

Notes

External links 
 Ben Ysursa's biography on the Idaho Secretary of State page
 Ben Ysursa's election results (2002, 2006)
 Criticism by chairman of the Idaho Democratic Party

Living people
People from Boise, Idaho
Idaho Republicans
Gonzaga University alumni
Saint Louis University School of Law alumni
Secretaries of State of Idaho
American people of Basque descent
Year of birth missing (living people)